Benny Lee (born December 5, 1965) is an American badminton player. He competed in two events at the 1992 Summer Olympics.

References

External links
 

1965 births
Living people
American male badminton players
Olympic badminton players of the United States
Badminton players at the 1992 Summer Olympics
Sportspeople from Yangon